Antarah ibn Shaddad al-Absi (ʿAntarah ibn Shaddād al-ʿAbsī; AD 525–608), also known as ʿAntar, was a pre-Islamic Arab knight and poet, famous for both his poetry and his adventurous life.  His chief poem forms part of the Mu'allaqāt, the collection of seven "hanging odes" legendarily said to have been suspended in the Kaaba. The account of his life forms the basis of a long and extravagant romance.

Life

ʿAntarah was born in Najd in Arabia. His father was Shaddād al-ʿAbsī, a respected warrior of the Banu Abs under their chief Zuhayr. His mother was an Ethiopian woman named Zabeebah. Described as an "Arab crow" (al-aghribah al-'Arab) owing to his dark complexion,ʿAntarah grew up a slave as well. He fell in love with his cousin ʿAblah, but could not hope to marry her owing to his position. He also gained the enmity of his father's wife Shammeah.

He gained attention and respect for himself by his remarkable personal qualities and courage in battle, excelling as an accomplished poet and a mighty warrior. He earned his freedom after another tribe invaded the lands of the Banu ʿAbs. When his father said to him, "ʿAntarah, fight with the warriors", he replied that "the slave doesn't know how to invade or how to defend, but is only good for milking goats and serving his masters". His father answered him: "Defend your tribe, O ʿAntar, and you are free". After defeating the invaders, he sought to gain permission to marry his cousin. To secure allowance to marry, Antarah had to face challenges including getting a special kind of camel from the northern Arab kingdom of the Lakhmids, then under Al-Nu'man III ibn al-Mundhir. ʿAntarah took part in the great war between the related tribes of ʿAbs and Dhubyān, which began over a contest of horses, and was named after them the war of Dāhis and Ghabrā.

The time and manner of his death are a matter of dispute. Ibn Doreid has him slain by Wasr-ben-Jaber or in battle against the Tai, while according to Abu Obeida he died a natural death in old age.

ʿAntarah's poetry is well preserved and often talks of chivalrous values, courage, and heroism in battle as well as his love for ʿAbla. It was immortalized when one of his poems was included in the Mu'allaqat, the collection of poems legendarily said to have been suspended in the Kaaba.  His poetry's historical and cultural importance stems from its detailed descriptions of battles, armour, weapons, horses, desert, and other themes from his time.

Legacy

The story of ʿAntar and ʿAbla was embroidered into a poetic saga traditionally credited to al-Asmaʿi, a poet in the court of Hārūn al-Rashīd. It is still recited by traditional story-tellers in Arab coffee houses. Its importance has been compared with English literature's Arthurian romances. His house and his stable were particularly legendary. One of the seven clans of Bethlehem is called the Anatreh, named after  ʿAntarah. It formerly acted as the guardians of the Church of the Nativity.

The Russian composer Nikolai Rimsky-Korsakov wrote his Symphony No. 2 based on the legend of ʿAntar. In 1898 the French painter Étienne Dinet published his translation of a 13th-century epic Arab poem Antar, which brought Antar bin Shaddad to European notice.  It has been followed by a number of derivative works such as Diana Richmond's Antar and Abla which furthered western exposure to the Antar bin Shaddad legends. "Antar" is the title of the first Palestinian opera, composed by the Palestinian musician Mustapha al-Kurd in 1988.

The Lebanese painter Rafic Charaf developed from the 1960s a series of paintings depicting the epics of Antar and Abla. These works that show his interest in the popular folklore of the region are considered a cornerstone in the artist's work.

In the late 1940s the British Lorry Manufacturer Thornycroft began the design of an oilfield tractor to carry pipes for the Anglo-Persian oil
`company which later became the Anglo-Iranian Oil Company.  The chosen name for the new Thornycroft tractor, which at the time was one of the largest tractors in the world, was the Thornycroft Mighty Antar.  The Antar moniker was chosen with reference to the mighty Warrior Antar.

Works
Antara's poems are published in Wilhelm Ahlwardt's The Divans of the six ancient Arabic poets (London, 1870); they have also been published separately at Beirût (1888). As regards their genuineness, cf. W. Ahlwardt's Bemerkungen über die Aechtheit der alten arabischen Gedichte (Greifswald, 1872), pp. 50ff. The Romance of 'Antar (Sīrat 'Antar ibn Shaddād) is a work which was long handed down by oral tradition only; it has grown to immense proportions and has been published in 32 vols. at Cairo (1889), and in 10 vols. at Beirût, 1871. It was partly translated by Terrick Hamilton under the title  'Antar, a Bedoueen Romance (4 vols, London, 1820). In addition, Sīrat 'Antar was translated into Turkish by the order of Fatih Sultan Mehmed in 1477 AD. The translator of the Turkish translation in three volumes is unknown. The manuscript copies of the Turkish translation known as "Qıssa-i 'Antar" are available in the Topkapı Palace Museum Library.

See also
 Arabic literature & romance literature
 Banu Abs
 Thornycroft Antar - British pipeline tractor named after his strength and endurance

Notes

References
 

Attribution

External links

English translation of Antara's Hanged Poem
another link to the same
The Hanged Poem of Antara (Arabic)
The Hanged Poem of Antara "another version" (Arabic)
Antar of Antarah, translated by Terrick Hamilton

6th-century Arabic poets
7th-century Arabic poets
Arab people of Ethiopian descent
Medieval Arabic literature
Love in Arabic literature
525 births
608 deaths
Ghatafan